Dwayn Holter (born 15 June 1995) is a Luxembourgian professional footballer who plays as a midfielder for Racing FC.

Club career
Holter has played club football for CS Fola Esch, Racing FC and Greuther Fürth II.

In July 2014 he signed his first professional contract with Greuther Fürth for four years until 2018. In July 2015, he moved to 3. Liga side VfR Aalen on a season-long loan. He joined CS Fola Esch in January 2016. After playing for Differdange  and Belgian club  Virton, he returned to Racing FC in 2019.

International career
Holter was born in Luxembourg and is of Cape Verdean descent. He made his international debut for Luxembourg in 2014.

References

External links
 

1995 births
Living people
Luxembourgian footballers
Luxembourg international footballers
Luxembourgian people of Cape Verdean descent
Association football midfielders
Luxembourg National Division players
Regionalliga players
Racing FC Union Luxembourg players
SpVgg Greuther Fürth players
SpVgg Greuther Fürth II players
VfR Aalen players
CS Fola Esch players
FC Differdange 03 players
R.E. Virton players
Luxembourgian expatriate footballers
Luxembourgian expatriate sportspeople in Germany
Expatriate footballers in Germany
Luxembourgian expatriate sportspeople in Belgium
Expatriate footballers in Belgium